Tiril Kampenhaug Eckhoff (born 21 May 1990) is a Norwegian former biathlete.

Eckhoff is a two-time Olympic champion, winning the mixed relay at the 2014 Sochi Winter Olympics and 2022 Winter Olympics, and also won a bronze in the mass start, a feat she repeated at the 2018 Winter Olympics. Eckhoff is also a ten-time gold medalist at the Biathlon World Championships, winning gold in the 7.5 km sprint at the Biathlon World Championships 2016, and both the 7.5 km sprint and 10 km pursuit at the Biathlon World Championships 2021. She is the sister of fellow biathlete Stian Eckhoff.

Career
Eckhoff has been part of the Norwegian biathlon team since 2008.

Eckhoff competed in Biathlon at the 2014 Winter Olympics in Sochi, where she won 3 medals. Bronze in the mass start and in the women's relay and gold in the mixed relay together with Tora Berger, Ole Einar Bjørndalen and Emil Hegle Svendsen. She is the sister of former biathlete Stian Eckhoff and studied engineering at the Norwegian Institute of Technology.

In 2016, she became World Champion on 7.5  km sprint in her home arena, Holmenkollen, in Norway. She was also part of the Norwegian team who took the bronze medal in the mixed relay and played an instrumental part in the Norwegian women's relay gold medal, shooting 10/10 as the third skier.

In the 19–20 season, she won seven World Cup races, but she finished second in the Overall, behind Dorothea Wierer. She won her first-ever discipline title in pursuit.

In the 20–21 season, she won 4 gold and took 6 medals in 7 races during the Biathlon World Championships 2021. Later in the season, she won the 2020–21 World Cup overall title, winning the most races in a season since Magdalena Forsberg. She also won the discipline title in sprint and pursuit, becoming the first male or female biathlete to win seven consecutive races in a discipline (sprint competition).

She was awarded the Holmenkollen Medal in 2022.

Eckhoff did not participate in the 2022–23 Biathlon World Cup due to health issues. On March 15, 2023, she announced through her social media that she will not return to competing.

Biathlon results
All results are sourced from the International Biathlon Union.

Olympic Games
8 medals (2 gold, 3 silver, 3 bronze)

*The mixed relay was added as an event in 2014.

World Championships
15 medals (10 gold, 2 silver, 3 bronze)

*During Olympic seasons competitions are only held for those events not included in the Olympic program.
**The single mixed relay was added as an event in 2019.

World Cup

World cup Individual Victories
 29 victories – (14 Sp, 11 Pu, 3 MS, 1 In)

References

External links
 
 
 
 
 

Norwegian female biathletes
Sportspeople from Bærum
1990 births
Living people
Biathletes at the 2014 Winter Olympics
Biathletes at the 2018 Winter Olympics
Biathletes at the 2022 Winter Olympics
Olympic biathletes of Norway
Medalists at the 2014 Winter Olympics
Medalists at the 2018 Winter Olympics
Medalists at the 2022 Winter Olympics
Olympic gold medalists for Norway
Olympic silver medalists for Norway
Olympic bronze medalists for Norway
Olympic medalists in biathlon
Biathlon World Championships medalists
21st-century Norwegian women